Janek Mäggi (born 5 September 1973) is an Estonian politician, television presenter and writer.

He served as Minister of Public Administration in the first cabinet of Prime Minister Jüri Ratas from 2 May 2018 to 29 April 2019. He is affiliated with the Estonian Centre Party.

In 1999, he graduated from School of Law of the University of Tartu.

References 

Living people
1973 births
Place of birth missing (living people)
Government ministers of Estonia
21st-century Estonian politicians
Estonian Centre Party politicians
Estonian television presenters
Estonian screenwriters
University of Tartu alumni